My Mind's Flower Rain is a 2016 South Korea morning soap opera starring Na Hae-ryung, Lee Chang-wook, and Ji Eun-sung. It will air on KBS2 from February 29, 2016 on Mondays to Fridays at 09:00 (KST) to 09:45 (KST).

It is the 40th TV Novel series (9th in 2010s) of KBS.

Summary 
A story of a bright young girl who lost her family during the Korean War and grew up experiencing the rapid change of the Korean society in the 1970s.

Cast

Main 
 Na Hae-ryeong as Jung Kkot-nim / Min Sun-ah
 Lee Chang-wook as Lee Kang-wook
 Park Sang-hoon as young Lee Kang-wook
 Jung Yi-yeon as Min Hye-joo
 Ji Eun-sung as Park Sun-ho

Supporting

People around Kkot-nim (Adopted) 
  as Jung Ji-taek
 Baek Hyun-joo as Oh Choon-shim
  as Jung Do-chul
  as Jung Ki-soon

People around Sun-ho 
  as Park Min-kyoo
  as Lee Young-im

People around Hye-joo 
 Im Ji-eun as Jun Il-ran (Fake Seo Yeon-hee)
  as Kim Jye-ok
  as Min Deok-soo
 Jo Ye-rin as Nub Young-ji

References

External links
  

Korean Broadcasting System television dramas
Korean-language television shows
2016 South Korean television series debuts
2017 South Korean television series endings